Nathan Gorman (born 25 June 1996) is a British professional boxer. He held the WBC International Silver heavyweight title from 2017 to 2019 and challenged twice for the British heavyweight title in 2019 and 2022.

Early life
Gorman was born on 25 June 1996 in Nantwich, Cheshire. He used to playfully spar with his dad as a child and credits his dad with being a big influence on his boxing career, giving his full backing when he chose to take up boxing. Gorman is of Irish Traveller heritage; he is the great-nephew of the undefeated bare-knuckle fighter Bartley Gorman, the 'King of the Gypsies', and the cousin of heavyweight boxers Tyson Fury and Hughie Fury, and light-heavyweight boxer and former Love Island contestant Tommy Fury.

Amateur career
Gorman won the youth ABA in Manchester and the Three Nations in Scotland before joining the Team GB where he trained and sparred with Daniel Dubois.

Professional career

Gorman vs. Velecky 
Gorman made his professional debut, under the tutelage of Ricky Hatton and promoted by the Hatton Promotions, on 15 December 2015 against Jindrich Velecky at the Walsall Town Hall, winning via in third round technical knockout (TKO).

Gorman vs. Howe 
In his sixth fight on 1 October 2016, he beat David Howe to win the vacant Central Area heavyweight title.

In July 2017, it was announced that Gorman has signed a promotional contract with Frank Warren's Queensberry Promotions, with his future fights set to be televised on BoxNation and BT Sport.

Gorman vs. Soltby 
He stopped Mohamed Soltby in five rounds in November 2017 to win the vacant WBC International Silver title.

Gorman vs. Cojanu 
He retained his title with a unanimous decision (UD) victory over former WBO heavyweight title challenger Răzvan Cojanu in December 2018.

Gorman vs. Johnson 
He defeated veteran Kevin Johnson by UD over ten rounds in March 2019.

Gorman vs. Dubois 
In July 2019, he fought Daniel Dubois for the vacant British heavyweight title, losing by knockout (KO) in the fifth round, his first loss in 17 fights. Dubois was ranked #11 by the WBO at heavyweight at the time.

Gorman vs. Lartey 
in his next bout, Gorman fought and defeated Richard Lartey via unanimous decision, winning 100-90, 100-90 and 98-92 on the scorecards.

Gorman vs. Sour 
In his next bout, Gorman defeated Pavel Sour via TKO in the second round.

Gorman vs. Salek 
In his next bout, Gorman beat Tomas Salek by technical knockout in the first round.

Gorman vs. Wardley 
For his next bout, Gorman fought Fabio Wardley for the vacant British heavyweight title. He lost by 3rd round TKO.

Professional boxing record

References

External links 
Nathan Gorman - Profile, News Archive & Current Rankings at Box.Live

English male boxers
Sportspeople from Cheshire
Heavyweight boxers
1996 births
Living people
English people of Irish descent
Irish Travellers from England
Irish Traveller sportspeople